The 2010–11 season is Al Ain Sports and Cultural Club's 35th season in Pro-League. Al Ain in this season will seek to win trophies, and competing in the Pro-League, the Champions League, the Presidents Cup, and the Etisalat Cup, after a frustrating season in 2009–10.

Season overview

March
On 24 March, Al Ain, lost his second game in the second round against Al Sharjah, to Increases the pressure on the Board of Directors because of The club's position in the league. On 25 March, The Board of Directors resigned Shiekh Abdullah bin Mohammed bin Khalid Al Nahyan Has been appointed as the chairman of the Board of Directors, the membership of Rashid Mubarak Al Hajiri, Awad Hasoum Al Darmaki, Mohammed bin Abdullah bin Badwah, and Mohammed bin Obaid Al Daheri by Mohammed bin Zayed Al Nahyan
On 31 March, Al Ain won after 209 days against arch-rivals Al Wahda.

Club

Technical and administrative staff 
{| class="wikitable"
|-
! style="color:#FFFFFF; background: #7300E6; border:2px solid #AB9767;"|Position
! style="color:#FFFFFF; background: #7300E6; border:2px solid #AB9767;"|Name
|-

 Matheus Henrique

 Abdelnasser Aljohny Deniz Ozay

Technical staff changes

During the season

Administrative staff

During the season

Board of directors

Goalscorers
{| class="wikitable" style="font-size: 100%; text-align: center;"
|-
!width=20|
!width=20|
!width=20|
!width=200|Player
!width=50|League
!width=50|League Cup
!width=50|President's Cup
!width=50|Champions League
!width=50|Total
|-
|1
|10
|MF
|align="left"| Omar Abdulrahman
|8||||1||2||11
|-
|—
|9
|FW
|align="left"| José Sand
|7||4||||||11
|-
|3
|38
|MF
|align="left"| Elias Ribeiro
|5||1||||4||10
|-
|4
|29
|FW
|align="left"| Jumaa Saeed
|2||4||||||6
|-
|5
|70
|MF
|align="left"| Bandar Al-Ahbabi
|||3||||||3
|-
|—
|20
|MF
|align="left"| Mohamed Abdulrahman
|3||||||||3
|-
|—
|31
|MF
|align="left"| Haddaf Al Ameri
|||2||||1||3
|-
|8
|2
|FW
|align="left"| Abdulaziz Fayez
|2||||||||2
|-
|—
|26
|MF
|align="left"| Hamad Al Marri
|||||1||1||2
|-
|—
|23
|MF
|align="left"| Shehab Ahmed
|1||||1||||2
|-
|—
|11
|MF
|align="left"| Saif Mohammed
|||2||||||2
|-
|—
|8
|MF
|align="left"| Brahima Keita
|||2||||||2
|-
|—
|—
|DF
|align="left"| Mohanad Salem
|1||||1||||2
|-
|—
|5
|DF
|align="left"| Ismail Ahmed
|1||1||||||2
|-
|—
|44
|DF
|align="left"| Fares Jumaa
|2||||||||2
|-
|16
|7
|MF
|align="left"| Ali Al-Wehaibi
|1||||||||1
|-
|—
|8
|MF
|align="left"| Ahmed Al Shamisi
|||||1||||1
|-
|colspan="4"|Own Goals
|||||||1||
|-
|colspan="4"|TOTALS
|33||19||5||8||65

Disciplinary record

Assists
{| class="wikitable" style="font-size: 100%; text-align: center;"
|-
!width=20|
!width=20|
!width=20|
!width=200|Player
!width=50|League
!width=50|League Cup
!width=50|President's Cup
!width=50|Champions League
!width=50|Total
|-
|—	
|8
|MF
|align="left"| Ahmed Al Shamisi
|||||1||||1
|-
|—	
|9
|FW
|align="left"| Valentin Badea
|||||||1||1
|-
|—	
|10
|MF
|align="left"| Omar Abdulrahman
|||||||1||1
|-
|—	
|11
|MF
|align="left"| Saif Mohammed
|||1||||||1
|-
|—	
|13
|MF
|align="left"| Rami Yaslam
|||||||1||1
|-
|—	
|23
|MF
|align="left"| Shehab Ahmed
|||1||||||1
|-
|—	
|26
|MF
|align="left"| Hamad Al Marri
|||||1||||1
|-
|—	
|28
|MF
|align="left"| Faraj Jumaa
|||1||||||1
|-
|—	
|29
|FW
|align="left"| Jumaa Saeed
|||2||||||1
|-
|—	
|31
|FW
|align="left"| Haddaf Al Ameri
|||||||1||1
|-
|—	
|33
|DF
|align="left"| Mohammed Al-Dhahri
|||1||||||1
|-
|—	
|36
|GK
|align="left"| Dawoud Sulaiman
|||1||||||1
|-
|—	
|38
|FW
|align="left"| Elias Ribeiro
|||1||||||1
|-
|—	
|70
|MF
|align="left"| Bandar Al-Ahbabi
|||2||||1||1
|-
|—	
|77
|DF
|align="left"| Hazza Salem
|||||1||||1
|-
|colspan="4"|TOTALS
|||||||||

Clean sheets
{| class=wikitable 
|-
!Rank
!Player
!Clean sheets 
|-
|align=center|1
|align=left| Dawoud Sulaiman
|rowspan=1 align="center" |5
|-
|align=center|2
|align=left| Abdullah Sultan
|rowspan=1 align="center" |4
|-
|align=center|3
|align=left| Waleed Salem
|rowspan=1 align="center" |3
|-
|align=center|4
|align=left| Ismail Rabee
|rowspan=1 align="center" |2
|-
|colspan="2" align="center"|TOTALS
|align=center|14

References

External links
 Al Ain FC official website 

2010-11
Emirati football clubs 2010–11 seasons